Isogona snowi or Snow's owlet, is a moth of the family Erebidae. The species was first described by John B. Smith in 1908. It is found in southern Texas and Mexico.

Adults are on wing year round.

The larvae feed on Celtis pallida.

References

Original description: Smith, John B. Journal of the New York Entomological Society: 96-97

Boletobiinae
Moths of North America
Moths described in 1908